Paston Great Barn  is a medieval barn near Paston Hall on the southeast edge of  the village of Paston in northeast Norfolk, owned by the North Norfolk Historic Buildings Trust. Dating from 1581, the building has a long association with the Paston family. A scheduled monument and a grade II* listed building, the barn is the centre of a  biological Site of Special Scientific Interest, a National Nature Reserve and a Special Area of Conservation. It is in the Norfolk Coast Area of Outstanding Natural Beauty.

The barn  
The barn is a long, low building, with a thatched roof, and walls built of brick, flint and limestone, with large doors with timber lintels. The barn was commissioned by Sir William Paston III as a grain store and threshing barn. It has been granted Grade II* listed building status by English Heritage due to its architectural and historical importance. Unusually for a barn it has two date stones, one over an entrance and one in a gable end. Additionally, a plaque over the south door records: "THE BILDING OF THIS BEARNE IS Bl SIR W PASTON KNIGHTE".

The barn and its immediate surroundings was notified as a biological Site of Special Scientific Interest by English Nature in 1999, and from April 2005, the site has also been designated as a Special Area of Conservation.

In 2002, English Nature, took on a 50-year lease of the barn. There is currently no public access into the barn, partly in order to minimise disturbance to the bats, although some educational interpretation at the site is being considered for the future.

Bats
The barn is one of only six known maternity roosts in Britain for the barbastelle bat, a species which is rare at a European scale, and it is the only roost in a building. The colony was discovered in 1996. The barbastelles mostly roost in large crevices in timber lintels over the barn doors. Their feeding grounds are believed to include nearby coastal cliffs.

Breeding colonies of Natterer's bat (Myotis nattereri), brown long-eared bat (Plecotus auritus) and common pipistrelle (Pipistrellus pipistrellus) also inhabit the barn.

References

External links
 BBC News coverage of the leasing of the barn by English Nature

Scheduled monuments in Norfolk
Sites of Special Scientific Interest in Norfolk
Sites of Special Scientific Interest notified in 1999
Special Areas of Conservation in England
Barns in England
Grade II* listed buildings in Norfolk
National nature reserves in England